Rufus Edward Foster (May 22, 1871 – August 23, 1942) was a United States circuit judge of the United States Court of Appeals for the Fifth Circuit and previously was a United States district judge of the United States District Court for the Eastern District of Louisiana.

Education and career

Born in Mathews County, Virginia, Foster received a Bachelor of Laws from Tulane University Law School in 1895. He was in the United States Army as a Lieutenant from 1898 to 1899. He was an Assistant United States Attorney for the Eastern District of Louisiana from 1905 to 1908. He was the United States Attorney for the Eastern District of Louisiana in 1908. He was a Professor of Law for the Tulane University Law School from 1912 to 1927, and Dean of that institution from 1920 to 1927.

Federal judicial service

Foster was nominated by President Theodore Roosevelt on January 22, 1909, to a seat on the United States District Court for the Eastern District of Louisiana vacated by Judge Eugene Davis Saunders. He was confirmed by the United States Senate on February 2, 1909, and received his commission the same day. His service terminated on January 13, 1925, due to his elevation to the Fifth Circuit.

Foster was nominated by President Calvin Coolidge on January 3, 1925, to a seat on the United States Court of Appeals for the Fifth Circuit vacated by Judge Alexander Campbell King. He was confirmed by the Senate on January 13, 1925, and received his commission the same day. He was a member of the Conference of Senior Circuit Judges (now the Judicial Conference of the United States) from 1935 to 1941. His service terminated on August 23, 1942, due to his death.

References

Sources

External links
 

1871 births
1942 deaths
Judges of the United States District Court for the Eastern District of Louisiana
United States district court judges appointed by Theodore Roosevelt
Judges of the United States Court of Appeals for the Fifth Circuit
United States court of appeals judges appointed by Calvin Coolidge
20th-century American judges
Tulane University Law School alumni
Tulane University faculty
Tulane University Law School faculty
Deans of Tulane University Law School
Deans of law schools in the United States
People from Mathews County, Virginia
United States Army officers
United States Attorneys for the Eastern District of Louisiana
Assistant United States Attorneys